Harry Jay Knowles (born December 11, 1971) is an American film critic and writer known for his website called Ain't It Cool News. Knowles was a member of the Austin Film Critics Association until he was removed in September 2017 "by a substantial majority vote" of the organization following allegations of sexual assault.

Early life
Harry Jay Knowles was born in Austin, Texas, the son of Jarrell Jay Knowles and Helen Jane (Harrison) Knowles, who married September 19, 1970, in Austin. His parents then settled in Austin. Knowles' parents separated in 1983 and divorced March 12, 1984; his mother received custody of him and his younger sister Dannie. The children subsequently lived with their mother on her family's ranch, the Portwood Ranch in Seymour, Texas. Knowles' other activities included the Boy Scouts of America, where he attained the rank of Eagle Scout.

On January 24, 1996, Knowles tripped on a hose at a memorabilia show and partially paralyzed his legs. Then, "like the 12-year-old asthmatic Scorsese, or the wunderkind Coppola stricken with polio," he wrote, he realized his destiny was to become an internet movie journalist.

Career
His first semi-professional job was providing weekend box office reports to the Drudge Report.

Reviewer
After purchasing a computer in 1994, Knowles started to navigate the Internet and began frequenting newsgroups to exchange gossip and rumors with other fans about upcoming films. After being chastised by future film critic Mike D'Angelo for posting binary image files to the newsgroups, Knowles launched the website that would become Ain't It Cool News in February 1996.

Appearances in the media
Because of the popularity of the website, Knowles was sought out by the mainstream media, including magazines, newspapers, and television news programs. In 2000, he was ranked No. 95 in the Forbes Celebrity 100. Knowles has made guest appearances on the television shows Siskel & Ebert & the Movies and Politically Incorrect.

Knowles is featured in the documentary For the Love of Movies: The Story of American Film Criticism as an advocate of film criticism on the Internet; he articulates the divide between older and younger critics and advocates for the films of Michael Bay, as well as being one of the first major critics to champion genre favorite Adam Green.

Film events

Butt-Numb-a-Thon

From 1999 to 2016, on the weekend closest to his birthday (December 11), Knowles hosted an event called Butt-Numb-A-Thon. The event, also known as Geek Christmas, was a 24-hour celebration of film, featuring unofficial premieres, and vintage films, from classics reprinted for the big-screen, to the rare, weird and unheard of. Film fans and professionals alike traveled from all over the United States and the world to attend the event, which was hosted in Austin at the South Lamar Alamo Drafthouse. BNAT was called "the world's most exclusive and mysteriously secretive film celebration" and "the hardest film event to get into in the country". Following revelations of sexual assault and harassment allegations against Knowles in September 2017, the Alamo Drafthouse, which had been the venue for the festival, ended all association with Knowles.

Fantastic Fest
Knowles is a co-founder of the annual Fantastic Fest, held in Austin. It was founded in 2005 by Knowles, Tim League of Alamo Drafthouse, Paul Alvarado-Dykstra, and Tim McCanlies, writer of The Iron Giant and Secondhand Lions. The festival focuses on genre films such as horror, science fiction, fantasy, action, Asian, and cult. The festival takes place in September at the Alamo Drafthouse South Lamar.

On September 21, 2017, days before allegations of sexual assault by Knowles surfaced, it was announced that AICN had been dropped as a sponsor of the festival. On September 25, 2017, the Alamo Drafthouse severed all business ties with Knowles.

Controversies

Accusations of biased reviews
Knowles attends events offered to the press, paid for by the movie studios, including visits to movie sets and premieres. Questions have sometimes emerged about the resulting impartiality of his articles and reviews. For example, after being flown to the premiere of the 1998 Godzilla movie, he gave the movie a wildly positive review, while the vast majority of critics disliked the film. Knowles later reversed his position and panned the film after the ensuing outcry. Knowles and his defenders have noted that he has given mixed reviews to movies for which he has been sent to junkets and premieres, and in any case is often out of step with mainstream critics. 

Knowles also gave a negative review to the film Monkeybone, in which he made a cameo appearance. In 1999, Knowles praised a script by Drew McWeeny and Scott Swan, but he did not mention that McWeeny was a contributor to the site (writing under the pseudonym "Moriarty"). This and other alleged lapses were reported in a series of articles in Film Threat magazine.

Fake Oscar nominees story
In early 2000, Knowles posted materials stolen from an ABC staffer's home computer, which Knowles took at face value to be the Oscar nominees for the Academy Awards—a day before the official announcement. When the actual nominees were announced the following day, it was discovered that his finalists in almost every category were incorrect. Knowles acknowledged his error when it became clear he was wrong, but then disclosed the IP address of the person whose computer had been hacked, compounding the error. The Academy considered suing Knowles for trademark and copyright infringement, but ultimately decided against it.

Feud with Uwe Boll
Filmmaker Uwe Boll has long feuded with Knowles, calling him a "retard" in response to his criticisms and accusing him of being "played" by film studios that "kissed his ass" with set visits and fake interest in producing movies for him, and suggesting to Knowles that the reason he hates him is because "I never kissed your ass, Harry."

Texas Chain Saw Massacre cast visit claims
Knowles claims that at his third birthday party, he was treated to a visit from the entire cast of The Texas Chain Saw Massacre. Knowles retains extremely detailed, happy memories of the event, including being given a basket full of dismembered body part props from Gunnar Hansen (the actor who played Leatherface), as well as cutting his birthday cake with the actual chainsaw used in the film. Hansen adamantly denied that any of this ever occurred.

Sexual assault allegations
On September 23, 2017, it was reported on IndieWire and circulated in other national media that Knowles had allegedly sexually assaulted a woman named Jasmine Baker on two occasions in 1999 and 2000 at Alamo Drafthouse events in Austin; furthermore, Baker stated that, while Drafthouse's co-founders Tim and Karrie League were horrified to learn of the incident, they "didn't know what to do" and suggested that she "just avoid" Knowles, who denied the accusation.

In response to the story, a number of Ain't It Cool News contributors resigned from the site. Ain't It Cool writer Horrorella announced her departure on September 24. Longtime writers Steve Prokopy, who used the pseudonym "Capone", and Eric Vespe, known as "Quint", both of whom had been with the site since its beginnings, announced September 25 that they were leaving AICN.

On September 25, Alamo Drafthouse owner Tim League announced that the company, whose theater had served as home to the annual Butt-Numb-A-Thon film fest Knowles organized, had severed all ties with Knowles as a result of the controversy, while the Austin Film Critics Association voted to remove Knowles as a member of the group.

By September 26, four more women had come forward on social media and through interviews with IndieWire to accuse Knowles of sexual assault and sexual harassment.

Following the release of the additional women's allegations, Knowles announced on social media on September 26, 2017, that he was taking a leave of absence from Ain't It Cool News.

On March 11, 2020, Knowles posted "AN APOLOGY" on the site, three years after the accusations.

Personal life

Knowles married Patricia Cho Jones on July 15, 2007, at Green Pastures in Austin.

On April 4, 2008, Knowles announced that he was diagnosed as a type 2 diabetic. In January 2011, Knowles underwent emergency spinal surgery to his T-10 vertebra. According to Knowles, the surgery restored sensation in his legs for the first time in over 15 years, and he would be undergoing physical therapy to learn to walk again.

Film credits
 The Ballad of the Sad Café (1991)
 Colin Fitz Lives! (1997)
 The Faculty (1998)
 Monkeybone (2001)
 Ghosts of Mars (2001)
 The Texas Chainsaw Massacre (2003)
 No Pain, No Gain (2005)
 Pathogen (2006)
 Zombie Girl: The Movie (2008)
 My Sucky Teen Romance (2011)
 Comic-Con Episode IV: A Fan's Hope (2011)

Portrayals
He was played by Ethan Suplee in the 2009 movie Fanboys.

References

Further reading
 Harry Knowles, Paul Cullum, Mark Ebner (March 5, 2002). Ain't It Cool?: Hollywood's Redheaded Stepchild Speaks Out (1st edition). Warner Books. .

External links
 
 

1971 births
American film critics
American Internet celebrities
Living people
Writers from Austin, Texas
People from Baylor County, Texas